Live at Willisau is a live album by South African pianist and composer Chris McGregor's big band Brotherhood of Breath. It was recorded on January 27, 1973, in Willisau, Switzerland, and was released on LP by Ogun Records in 1974. In 1994, the album was reissued on CD with extra tracks. The recording took place eight days after the concert heard on Travelling Somewhere (Cuneiform, 2001).

Reception

In a review for AllMusic, Scott Yanow wrote: "This is intriguing music that should have been more extensively documented. Adventurous listeners can be grateful that at least this document and a few others exist."

The authors of The Penguin Guide to Jazz Recordings stated: "this is affirmative music of a rare sort, bringing together African kwela, free jazz, post-Ellington swing and even touches of classicism in a boiling mix that grips the heart."

In an article for Bells, Henry Kuntz called the album "McGregor’s best record yet," and commented: "McGregor's scores stem mainly from strong and simple themes that reflect the South African idioms that did so much to fuel his sextet and, later, Spear, and from the song tradition bequeathed from Albert Ayler... They ride easily over a good rhythm section where for once Louis Moholo has been recorded at his unrestrained best. There are plenty of good solos too."

Author John Litweiler stated that the album "mingles swinging ensembles and catchy rhythms with collective cacophony... Agony and ecstasy mingle indescribably; the music is a volatile release of tensions, into—what? There's no conclusion to the music, no resolution, no catharsis, not even exhaustion."

Critic Tom Hull remarked: "They can get pretty far out, but South African roots run deep, and when they get the jive working... it's quite some party."

LP track listing

Side A
 "Do It" (Chris McGregor) – 9:54
 "Restless" (Chris McGregor) – 2:38
 "Kongi's Theme" (Chris McGregor) – 6:45

Side B
 "Tungi's Song" (Tungi Oyelana) – 6:45
 "Ismite is Might" (Chris McGregor) – 4:30
 "The Serpents Kindly Eye" (Chris McGregor) – 8:30

CD track listing
 "Do It" (Chris McGregor) – 11:08
 "Restless" (Chris McGregor) – 2:40
 "Camel Dance" (Chris McGregor) – 7:13
 "Davashe's Dream" (Mackay Davashe) – 7:44
 "Kongi's Theme" (Chris McGregor) – 6:40
 "Tunji's Song" (Tungi Oyelana) – 6:51
 "Ismite is Might" (Chris McGregor) – 4:28
 "The Serpent's Kindly Eye" (Chris McGregor) – 8:25
 "Andromeda" (Chris McGregor) – 3:58
 "Union Special" (Chris McGregor) – :57
 "Funky Boots" (Gary Windo, Nick Evans) – 5:41

Personnel 
 Chris McGregor – leader, piano
 Dudu Pukwana – alto saxophone
 Evan Parker – tenor saxophone
 Gary Windo – tenor saxophone
 Mongezi Feza – trumpet
 Harry Beckett – trumpet
 Marc Charig – trumpet
 Nick Evans – trombone
 Radu Malfatti – trombone
 Harry Miller – bass
 Louis Moholo – drums

References

1974 live albums
Brotherhood of Breath live albums
Ogun Records live albums